Sinta is a Latvian and Indonesian feminine given name.

Notable people named Sinta
Sinta Nuriyah (born 1948), former First Lady of Indonesia
Sinta Ozoliņa-Kovala (born 1988), Latvian javelin thrower
Sinta Tantra (born 1979), British artist
Sinta Wullur (born 1958), Indonesian-Dutch gamelan musician and composer

References 

Indonesian feminine given names
Latvian feminine given names
Feminine given names